Pavlova is a genus of algae belonging to the family Pavlovaceae.

The genus has cosmopolitan distribution.

The genus name of Pavlova is in honour of Anna Pawlowna Pawlowa (1881–1931), who was a Russian prima ballerina of the late 19th and the early 20th centuries. This is because "the movement of the type species, Pavlova gyrans, is positively balletic". 

The genus was circumscribed by Roger William Butcher in J. Mar. Biol. Assoc. U.K. vol.31 on page 183, fig. 35-38 in 1952.

Species
As accepted by Algaebase;
Pavlova calceolata 
Pavlova ennorea 
Pavlova granifera 
Pavlova gyrans 
Pavlova helicata 
Pavlova hommersandii 
Pavlova lutheri 
Pavlova mesolychnon 
Pavlova noctivaga 
Pavlova pinguis 
Pavlova salina 
Pavlova virescens 
Pavlova viridis

References

Haptophyte genera